A Steambot is a steam powered robot. For more info see steampunk. It could also refer to:

 Steambot Chronicles, a PS2 RPG.